Kalak-e Naqi (also Romanized as Kalak-e Naqī; also known as Kalak Naftī and Sarāb-e Kalak) is a village in Gachi Rural District, Gachi District, Malekshahi County, Ilam Province, Iran. At the 2006 census, its population was 508, in 98 families. The village is populated by Kurds.

References 

Populated places in Malekshahi County
Kurdish settlements in Ilam Province